School of the Holy Child, established in 1904, is an American all-girls', Catholic, independent, college-preparatory school for grades 5 through 12, located in Rye, New York. 

The school is guided by the educational philosophy of Cornelia Connelly, the founder of the Society of the Holy Child Jesus, and her dedication to developing "young women of conscience and action".

Description
The school enrolls students from nearly 70 communities in Westchester, Fairfield, Putnam, New York and Bronx counties and offers programs in the humanities, global & religious studies, science & technology, engineering & architecture, arts & athletics, as well as field-based and service-learning programs.

The school's  campus in Rye contains a Tudor Revival mansion dating back to 1930, as well as recently constructed academic and extracurricular facilities. A $6.5 million capital campaign was completed in the summer of 2015. The campus expansion included a design studio for students who participate in architecture, engineering, and design courses, as well as a  Field House for sporting events. In the Field House are the  Kelly Gymnasium, Giordano Fitness Center, Ciaccia Athletic Training Room, dance studio, locker rooms, and The Kennedy Common Room. A theater was completed in January 2016.

In 2012, the school launched the Generoso Pope Italian Cultural Studies Program, a two-year program of language, history, research, and study of Italian culture that culminates in a two-week summer trip to Italy.

A year later, the school received a grant from the Edward E. Ford Foundation to expand the school's STEM program. Modeled after its humanities-based counterpart, the Engineering, Architecture, and Design for the Common Good Program is a two-year program that focuses on engineering, architecture, and digital design.

In 2018, the school received another grant from the Edward E. Ford Foundation to create the Leadership Institute in Finance, a two-year, college-level seminar course that covers financial literacy and business ethics.

In 2020, the Italian Cultural Studies Program became the broader, inquiry-based Advanced Humanities Institute.

A 1:1 laptop program and course offerings in robotics, computer coding, and computer gaming are available to students.

References

External links
 , the school's official website

1904 establishments in New York (state)
Catholic secondary schools in New York (state)
Educational institutions established in 1904
Girls' schools in New York (state)
Private middle schools in Westchester County, New York
Private high schools in Westchester County, New York
Society of the Holy Child Jesus